Sven Lampa ( 17 November 1839, Skaraborg – 2 December 1914, Lidingön) was a Swedish entomologist who specialised in Lepidoptera.
He wrote Förteckning öfver Skandinaviens och Finlands Macrolepidoptera. Ent. Tidskr. 6(1–3): 1–137. 9 (1885).

Swedish entomologists
1839 births
1914 deaths